Sham may refer to:

Arabic use
 Al-Sham or Shām (شام), the historical name for the Greater Syria region, now most commonly known as the Levant or the eastern Mediterranean, including the modern countries of Syria, Lebanon, Palestine, Israel, Jordan, Cyprus and Turkey's Hatay Province.
 Bilad al-Sham, the Caliphate province of the same region
 Jund al-Sham, militant group based in Afghanistan, meaning "Army of Syria"
 Sham el-Nessim, Egyptian holiday marking the beginning of spring
 Sham, or Alsahm, the Arabic name for the star Alpha Sagittae

English use
 Fraud
 Sham drug as a quack remedy
 Sham election, another name for a show election
 Sham marriage, a marriage entered into with intent to deceive
 Sham peer review, a fraudulent or malicious form of peer review
 Hoax
 Placebo, any drug, surgery, or other treatment with intentional (and usually blinded) lack of efficacy
 Sham drug as a placebo used in a single- or double-blinded control group of experiments (see treatment and control groups)
 Sham surgery, surgery omitting the therapeutic component, performed in the single-blinded control group of experiments
 Name of a person or group of people:
 Sam the Sham (born 1937), stage name of U.S. rock singer Domingo “Sam” Samudio
 Sham, nickname of Art Shamsky (born 1941), American Major League Baseball outfielder and Israel Baseball League manager
 Sham 69, English punk band
 Title of a work of art
 Sham (film), a lost 1921 silent film based on a Broadway play starring Ethel Clayton
 Sham (play), a 1920 one-act stage play by Frank G. Tompkins
 Other uses
 Sham, a name for the cover of a pillow
 SHAM, salicylhydroxamic acid, a drug that works against urinary tract infections

Chinese use
 Kohn–Sham equations, named after Walter Kohn and Lu Jeu Sham
 Sham Chun River, on the border of Hong Kong and mainland China
 Sham Shui Po District, a district of Hong Kong
 Sham Kwok Fai (born 1984), association football player from Hong Kong

Other uses
 Sham (name), list of people with the name
 Sham (horse), American Thoroughbred horse born in 1970 who won multiple graded stakes races
 Sham Stakes, a race named for the horse
 Sham, Iran
 Sham, a character in the X-Men 2099 comic book series
 Sham Pain, a single by American heavy metal band Five Finger Death Punch from And Justice For None
 Southern Hemisphere Annular Mode (SHAM), a climate pattern

See also
 Shams (disambiguation)
 Syria (disambiguation)